This is a list of the top selling singles and top selling albums in Ireland in 2002.

Top selling singles 
 "There's A Whole Lot Of Loving Going On" - Six
 "Boys" - Britney Spears with Pharrell Williams
 "Asereje" - Las Ketchup 
 "Whenever, Wherever" - Shakira 
 "Hero" - Enrique Iglesias
"The Logical Song" - Scooter
"Without Me" - Eminem 
"How You Remind Me" - Nickelback 
 "Anything Is Possible/Evergreen" - Will Young 
 "La Passion" - Gigi D'Agostino

Top selling albums 
 A Rush of Blood to the Head - Coldplay 
 Missundaztood - Pink
 The Best of 1990-2000 - U2 
 'By the Way - Red Hot Chili Peppers 
 Unbreakable - The Greatest Hits Vol. 1 - Westlife 
 Laundry Service - Shakira 
 The Eminem Show - Eminem 
 Escapology - Robbie Williams 
 Escape - Enrique Iglesias 
 A New Day At Midnight'' - David Gray

See also 
List of songs that reached number one on the Irish Singles Chart
List of artists who reached number one in Ireland

Resources 
IRMA Official Site

External links 
IRMA Official Site
Top40-Charts - Ireland Top 20

2002
2002 in Irish music